Autoroute 13 (or A-13, also known as Autoroute Chomedey with sections formerly known as Autoroute Mirabel), is a freeway in the urban region of Montreal, Quebec, Canada. Its southern end is at the junction of A-20 on the Island of Montreal near Pierre Elliott Trudeau International Airport. Its northern terminus is at the junction of A-640 near Boisbriand. The road traverses Laval.

Autoroute 13 was built as a toll highway in 1975 with a goal to connect the two international airports, Mirabel and Dorval (now Trudeau International Airport). The freeway is mostly six-laned and tolls no longer apply.

The designation of Autoroute Chomedey refers to the community of Chomedey in Laval, through which A-13 passes. Formerly, common usage was to refer to the autoroute as Autoroute Chomedey south of the Milles-Îles river, and Autoroute Mirabel north of that point. In recent usage, however, the Autoroute Chomedey name is generally used for the full length of the autoroute. Boulevard Pitfield is routed as a parallel service road to A-13 in St-Laurent.

Boulevard Pitfield derives its name from the origin of the actual route. In the 1920s, the actual route was a Polo Pony Trail leading from the various estates of the Saraguay Village residents to their Polo Fields, now where the area of St. Laurent Blvd and Bois Franc merge.  In the late 1930s the path became an unpaved local road. Over the next several decades Saraguay Farms, owned by Mrs. W.C. Pitfield, was paid to clear the road in the winter by the municipality of St. Laurent. The road was developed into a two-lane highway in the 1960s.

The Quebec provincial government was planning to extend Autoroute 13 north of A-640 in the late 1990s as an alternate route for A-15 (Autoroute Décarie/Autoroute des Laurentides).

Exit list

Lowest Annual Average Daily Traffic: 38 000 (between R-344 and A-640 in 2000)
Highest Annual Average Daily Traffic: 140 000 (between A-40 and A-440 in 2000)

References

External links 

Transport Quebec website
Transport Quebec map  
A-13 at motorways-exits.com
A-13 at Quebec Autoroutes
Steve Anderson's MontrealRoads.com: Chomedey Autoroute (A-13)

13
Roads in Montreal
Former toll roads in Canada